Hudlin is a surname. Notable people with the surname include:

Reginald Hudlin (born 1961), American writer, film director, and producer
Warrington Hudlin (born 1952), American film director, producer, and actor
Willis Hudlin (1906–2002), American baseball player